ELOY (Exquisite Lady of the Year) Awards is an award for women excelling in their field of work. It was established by Tewa Onasanya in 2009.

During the ELOY awards which was held in Lagos Continental Hotel in 2018, the convener Tewa Onasanya revealed that the nominees were selected from different walks of life and that there has to be a vote-count before anyone is duly awarded.

In 2019, the ELOY awards introduced a new development, in which the awards for the very first time would be celebrating a man, the category will celebrate a man or male-owned company, which empowers and employs women, the CEO, Tewa Onasanya stated that there was need to improve on the previous editions.

Some notable winners of ELOY awards in time past, are Adesua Etomi, Nancy Isime including BBNaija's Cee-C, Cynthia Nwadiora amongst others.

Winners of ELOY Awards in 2017 
Here are the winners of the ELOY awards in 2017:

 Fashion Designer of The Year - Bisola Adeniyi, Lady Bida
 On Air Personality - Moet Abebe, Sound City Fm; Adeyinka, R2 Fm Ibadan
 Blogger of The Year - Oma Ehiri, Sotectonic.Com
 Events Company - Dunamis Events, Funbi Akinyosoye
 Make Up Artist - Misz Poshmua, Linda Onyinye Chukwuka
 TV Presenter (Terrestrial And Online TV) - Idia Aisien,  Style 101 Show, Spice TV
 Actress Big Screen - Toyin Abraham, Alakada Reloaded
 Female Social Entrepreneur - Abisoye Ajayi Akinfolarin, Girl Coding (Pearl Africa Foundation)
Female Youtuber - Sisi Yemmie
TV Actress (Terrestrial And Online TV) - Abimbola Craig, Skinny Girl In Transit, Ndani TV
Female Chef / Food Designer - Bukky Tinko, The Kitchen Muse
Beauty Entrepreneur - Good Hair Limited
Female Movie Director - Kemi Adetiba, The Wedding Party
Female Music Artist of The Year - Symply Simi – Joromi
ELOY Woman Who Inspires Award in Tourism - Chiamaka Obuekwe
ELOY Woman Who Inspires in The Public Sector - Chinyere Anokuru

Winners of ELOY Awards in 2019 
Here are the winners of the ELOY awards in 2019:
 ELOY Award for Agriculture - Oyinye Okereke (The Fit Farmer), Landra Farms
 Young Entrepreneur - Florence Chikezie, ReDahlia Entrepreneurs NG
 ELOY Award for Digital Media Entrepreneur - Uche Pedro, Bella Naija
 On-Air Personality of the Year - Datwarrigirl (Tomama), Naija FM
 Actress of the year in association with FSDH Asset Management - Adesua Etomi-Wellington– SET UP
 TV Personality of the year - Nancy Isime, HIP TV
 ELOY Award for Humanitarian Services - Tola Makinde – MoRainbow Foundation
 ELOY Award for Beauty Entrepreneur - Julia Onamusi, Jules Lifestyle
 ELOY Award for Corporate Social Responsibility - Ifeyinwa Ugochukwu, Tony Elumelu Foundation
 ELOY Award for Fashion Entrepreneur - Obis Oragwu, Wardrobe Merchant
 ELOY award for Social Entrepreneur in association with FIRS - Chisom Ogbummuo, The Conversation Cafe
 ELOY Award for Influence - Cynthia Nwadiora Cee-C
 ELOY Award for Hairstylist sponsored by LUSH HAIR - Kemi Lewis, KLS NATURAL BEAUTY BAR
 ELOY Award for ICT/Technology - Adeola Shasanya   
 ELOY Award for Entrepreneur in association with FIRS - Ebele Udoh, Brandbox Africa

Winners of ELOY Awards in 2020 
Here are the winners of the ELOY awards in 2020:
 ELOY Award for Agriculture - Fajimi Ifedolapo Omobolade, Graceaion farms
 Entrepreneur of the Year - Kemi Ogunkoya
ELOY Award for Technology - Odunayo Eweniyi, Piggyvest 
Innovative Fashion Brand of the Year - Tolu Bally, 2207bytbally
Innovative Beauty practitioner of the Year –  Toke Makinwa, Toke Makinwa Beauty
On-Air Personality – Honey Ojukwu, CoolFM, Port Harcourt
TV Personality – Ebunoluwa Dosumu, Africa Movie Channel
ELOY Award for Influence –  Erica Nlewedim
ELOY Award for Young Entrepreneur – Omonike Fowowe, EMR Group
ELOY Award for Humanitarian (NGO) – Fadairo Adeyinka Abimbola, Joyful Givers
ELOY Award for Business/Human Performance Coach –  Marylin Oma Anona (Omalivingshow)
ELOY Foundation Award for Enterprise – Elizabeth Oladepo (07Foods)
Health Care Practitioner – Dr Maymunah Kadiri
HE4SHE – Adeshola Adeduntan (Managing Director First Bank)

References

Awards established in 2009
Entertainment events in Nigeria
Awards honoring women